Plays the Theme from The V.I.P.s and Other Great Songs is an album of theme music by jazz pianist Bill Evans with an orchestra conducted by Claus Ogerman recorded in 1963 for the MGM label.

Reception
The album was an intentionally commercial production and the tracks were omitted from the 18-CD collection The Complete Bill Evans on Verve as they were deemed to have negligible artistic merit. The Allmusic review awarded the album 3½ stars.

Track listing
 "Theme from "Mr. Novak"" (Lyn Murray) - 2:04
 "The Caretakers Theme" (Elmer Bernstein) - 2:51
 "More" (Riz Ortolani) - 2:40
 "Walk on the Wild Side" (Bernstein, Mack David) - 2:33
 "The Days of Wine and Roses" (Henry Mancini, Johnny Mercer) - 2:40
 "Theme from "The V.I.P.s"" (Miklós Rózsa) - 2:28
 "Hollywood" (Bill Evans, Claus Ogerman) - 3:35
 "Sweet September" (Bill McGuffie) - 2:16
 "On Green Dolphin Street" (Bronislaw Kaper, Ned Washington) - 2:42
 "The Man with the Golden Arm" (Elmer Bernstein, Sylvia Fine) - 2:32
 "Laura" (Johnny Mercer, David Raksin) - 2:31
 "On Broadway" (Jerry Leiber, Barry Mann, Mike Stoller, Cynthia Weil) - 2:32
Recorded in New York City on May 6, 1963

Personnel
Bill Evans - piano
Unidentified large orchestra, strings and choir
Claus Ogerman - arranger, conductor

References

1963 albums
MGM Records albums
Bill Evans albums
Albums produced by Creed Taylor
Albums conducted by Claus Ogerman
Albums arranged by Claus Ogerman